The kirigami were esoteric documents of the Sōtō school in medieval Japan which 

For instance, 

Some kirigami 

Kirigami were also 

Bernard Faure writes that the kirigami were 

Steven Heine writes that,

References

Sources

Soto Zen